Dyle  was a department of the French First Republic and French First Empire in present-day Belgium. It was named after the river Dyle (Dijle), which flows through the department. Its territory corresponded more or less with that of the Belgian province of Brabant, now divided into Walloon Brabant, Flemish Brabant and the Brussels-Capital Region. It was created on 1 October 1795, when the Austrian Netherlands and the Prince-Bishopric of Liège were officially annexed by the French Republic. Before the annexation, its territory was partly in the Duchy of Brabant, partly in the County of Hainaut, and partly in some smaller territories.

The Chef-lieu of the department was the City of Brussels (Bruxelles in French). The department was subdivided into the following three arrondissements and cantons (as of 1812):

 Bruxelles: Anderlecht, Asse, Bruxelles (4 cantons), Hal, La Hulpe, Lennik, Woluwe-Saint-Étienne, Uccle, Vilvorde and Wolvertem.
 Louvain: Aerschot, Diest, Glabbeek, Grez-Doiceau, Haecht, Léau, Louvain (2 cantons) and Tirlemont (2 cantons).
 Nivelles: Genappe, Hérinnes, Jodoigne, Nivelles (2 cantons), Perwez and Wavre. 

After the defeat of Napoleon the department became part of the United Kingdom of the Netherlands, as the province of (South) Brabant.

Administration

Prefects
The Prefect was the highest state representative in the department.

General Secretaries
The General Secretary was the deputy to the Prefect.

Subprefects of Bruxelles
The office of Subprefect of Bruxelles was held by the Prefect until 1811.

Subprefects of Louvain

Subprefects of Nivelles

References

Former departments of France in Belgium
1795 establishments in France
History of Flemish Brabant